Rahul Singh Lodhi is an Indian politician from Bharatiya Janata Party. In May 2021, he was elected as a member of the Madhya Pradesh Legislative Assembly from Damoh (constituency). He defeated Jayant Malaiya of Bharatiya Janata Party by 798 votes in 2018 Madhya Pradesh Assembly election. Lodhi joined Bharatiya Janata Party in October and was given a ticket for 2021 by-election where he was defeated by Ajay Kumar Tandon of Indian National Congress by 17,097 votes.

References 

Living people
Year of birth missing (living people)
21st-century Indian politicians
People from Damoh
Bharatiya Janata Party politicians from Madhya Pradesh
Indian National Congress politicians from Madhya Pradesh
Madhya Pradesh MLAs 2018–2023